

Chinese Given Name
In Chinese, Junpei is a name composed of two Chinese characters, where jun could be 君, 军, 俊, 骏, 峻, 筠, 珺, 均, 郡, 钧, 竣, 浚, 麇 or 隽, while pei could be 沛, 佩, 培, 裴, 霈, 旆 or 珮. Given a Chinese given name Junpei, it is usually difficult to tell whether it is a masculine or feminine given name. For example, 军佩 is more like a masculine given name, while 珺珮 is more like a feminine given name.

Japanese Given Name
In Japanese, Junpei or Jumpei (written: 淳平, 純平, 順平, 隼平 or 潤平) is a masculine given name. Notable people with the name include:

, Japanese music arranger and composer
, Japanese shogi player
, Japanese footballer
, Japanese actor
, Japanese judoka
, Japanese footballer
, Japanese painter
, Japanese footballer
, Japanese baseball player
, Japanese footballer
, Japanese voice actor
, Japanese footballer
, Japanese journalist
, Japanese speed skater

Fictional characters
Junpei Ryuzouji, a main character in Those Who Hunt Elves
Junpei (Megatokyo), a character from the web comic Megatokyo
Junpei Iori (伊織 順平), a character from Shin Megami Tensei: Persona 3
Junpei Shibayama (J.P. Shibayama in English dub), a character from Digimon Frontier
Junpei Tenmyouji, a major character and protagonist from the video game series Zero Escape
Junpei Hyuuga, a side character from Kuroko's Basketball
Junpei Kōsaka, the protagonist of Nyan Koi!
Junpei Manaka, a character from Ichigo 100%
Junpei Yoshino, a character from Jujutsu Kaisen

References

Chinese given names
Japanese masculine given names